2 Live Crew has released eight studio albums, one live album and 27 singles.

Albums

Studio albums

Live albums

Singles

References

Hip hop discographies
Discographies of American artists